The Ford Landau is a car which was produced by Ford Australia from 1973 to 1976.

Released in August 1973, the Ford Landau was based on the Australian XA series Ford Falcon but shared its frontal appearance and luxury features with the P5 series Ford LTD limousine, another Australian design which was released at the same time as the Landau. The Landau was available only as a two-door hardtop coupe and shared its  wheelbase with the Falcon. Its transmission was a three-speed “T-Bar SelectShift Cruisomatic” unit, allowing a choice of manual or fully automatic gear changing. Four wheel disc brakes were fitted, making the Landau and its similarly equipped LTD stablemate the first Australian-built cars with this feature.

The high levels of standard equipment fitted to the Landau meant that only two items were offered as optional equipment: a cassette deck and full leather interior trim. This factor, combined with the performance orientated mechanical specifications of the Landau meant that it never had a direct rival in the Australian marketplace. Plans to update the original P5 series Landau with the frontal styling of the forthcoming P6 series LTD resulted in the building of a P6 Landau design study, but the facelifted model was not put into production. The Landau was discontinued when the new LTD was released in 1976, after a total production run of 1385 vehicles.

The relationship between the Landau and the Falcon hardtop can be compared to that of the Ford’s American luxury marque Mercury’s Cougar, a luxury variant of the Mustang.

References

External links

 Ford LTD - Ford Landau sales brochure pages Retrieved from falcongt.com.au on 24 August 2008
 Ford Landau images Retrieved from falconcoupes.com.au on 24 August 2008

Cars of Australia
Landau
Coupés